The Fiji Girl Guides Association is the national Guiding organization of Fiji. It serves 1,829 members (as of 2003). Founded in 1924, the girls-only organization became a full member of the World Association of Girl Guides and Girl Scouts in 1981.

An annual camp is held. This lapsed for 20 years, but it was revived in 2007.

The uniforms they wear can be blue or white blouses and their skirts either blue, green, or white.

See also
Fiji Scouts Association

References

Scouting and Guiding in Fiji
World Association of Girl Guides and Girl Scouts member organizations
Youth organizations established in 1924